Ra:IN (an acronym for "Rock and Inspiration") is a Japanese instrumental rock band. Formed in 2002 by guitarist Pata, bassist Michiaki and drummer Tetsu, the group is signed to the Danger Crue label. Former hide with Spread Beaver keyboardist DIE joined the band in May 2007, and Tetsu left in April 2014, being replaced on the drums by Ryu. They have released three albums, a single and a two track EP, and have toured extensively, including international shows in China, Taiwan, France, Italy, Germany, Spain and Russia.

History
Ra:IN was formed as a power trio in summer 2002 with Pata on guitar, Michiaki on bass and Tetsu on drums. They were named by Masayoshi Kabe, Michiaki's bandmate in Zoku Zoku Kazoku. They went on their first tour in December, with their debut maxi-single "The Border" released in April of next year. It was followed by their first album The Line in November. They had their first overseas performances in 2004; Shanghai on April 24–25 and one in Taipei in July. RaIN performed three shows in Paris in May 2005, and at the closing of the hide museum on September 9 back in Japan. At the museum show, they were joined by former hide with Spread Beaver keyboardist DIE as a guest.

They released their second album Before the Siren, their first on popular independent record label Danger Crue, in March 2006 and embarked on tour in support of it, which included two more shows in Taipei. In 2007 they released the DVD Hard Rain and Rocks Live and performed two shows in Beijing, one of which was at the Beijing Pop Festival. That year, DIE officially joined the band as keyboardist. Their third album Metal Box was released in Japan in April 2008 and in France the following month. They also performed at the hide memorial summit at Ajinomoto Stadium on May 3.

In June 2009 Ra:IN began a lengthy European tour which took them to Rome, Ljubljana, Budapest, Warsaw, Gdynia, Berlin, Cologne, Moscow, Paris, Madrid, and ended in Hradec Králové at the Rock for People festival. The band released a special single sold only on the tour, titled "Circle/Psychogenic". They held the two man Rock’n Roll Vaudeville 2011 show together with Der Zibet on June 24, 2011. In September 2012, Ra:IN performed alongside Der Zibet, Ladies Room and Tokyo Yankees at the Yokohama Summer Rock Fes. – Revolution Rocks 2012.

It was announced on April 17, 2014 that Tetsu had left the group. Ra:IN performed in the United States at A-Kon on June 6–8, and Ryu officially joined the band as drummer on June 28. In January 2020, Ra:IN had to cancel two shows after Pata caught influenza.

Members
The members of Ra:IN are credited exclusively by their given or stage names.

  – guitar (X Japan, P.A.F., Dope HEADz)
  – bass (Tensaw, The Toys, Zoku Zoku Kazoku, Mosaw)
  – keyboard (2007–present) (hide with Spread Beaver, Loopus, Minimum Rockets, Kiss the World)
  – drums (2014–present)

Former members
  – drums (2002–2014) (Daizo & Elephants, P.A.F., Red Warriors, Cocco)

Discography
 "The Border" (April 3, 2003)
 The Line (November 7, 2003)
 Before the Siren (March 8, 2006)
 Metal Box (April 9, 2008)
 "Circle/Psychogenic" (2009, Special Edition EP sold on their 2009 European tour)

DVDs
 Hard Rain & Rocks Live (July 9, 2007)

References

External links

 Official website
 Official YouTube
 Pata official website
 Michiaki official website
 DIE official website
 Tetsu official website

Japanese progressive rock groups
Japanese hard rock musical groups
Japanese instrumental musical groups
Musical groups established in 2002
Musical quartets
2002 establishments in Japan